Grain Valley is a city in Jackson County, Missouri, United States. Grain Valley is located in the Kansas City Metropolitan Area and is a suburb of Kansas City. The population was 12,854 at the 2010 census and an estimated 14,526 in 2019.

History
Grain Valley was founded in the 1870s. The city was named for the general character of the grain-producing region. A post office called Grain Valley has been in operation since 1879. Grain Valley was founded primarily by former residents and business owners of Pink Hill, Missouri who moved to this area after the Chicago and Alton Railroad built a railway through this area in 1878, bypassing the former community of Pink Hill, Missouri.  The townspeople needed to take advantage of the commerce that the railroad would provide during this era.

Geography
Grain Valley is located at  (39.008733, -94.207465).

Demographics

At the 2010 census there were 12,854 people in 4,566 households, including 3,395 families, in the city. The racial makeup of the city was 92.6% White, 2.5% African American, 0.6% Native American, 0.6% Asian, 0.1% Pacific Islander, 1.2% from other races, and 2.3% from two or more races. Hispanic or Latino of any race were 4.9%.

Of the 4,566 households 47.4% had children under the age of 18 living with them, 56.0% were married couples living together, 13.1% had a female householder with no husband present, 5.3% had a male householder with no wife present, and 25.6% were non-families. 19.1% of households were one person and 5.6% were one person aged 65 or older. The average household size was 2.81 and the average family size was 3.22.

The median age was 30.5 years. 32.1% of residents were under the age of 18; 7.5% were between the ages of 18 and 24; 35.2% were from 25 to 44; 18.3% were from 45 to 64; and 6.8% were 65 or older. The gender makeup of the city was 48.9% male and 51.1% female.

2000 census
At the 2000 census there were 5,160 people. The racial makeup of the city was 96.43% White, 0.56% African American, 0.48% Asian, 0.39% Native American, 0.16% Pacific Islander, 0.43% from other races, and 1.55% from two or more races. Hispanic or Latino of any race were 2.48%.

Of the 1,921 households 44.9% had children under the age of 18 living with them, 61.2% were married couples living together, 9.8% had a female householder with no husband present, and 24.9% were non-families. 20.4% of households were one person and 6.6% were one person aged 65 or older. The average household size was 2.69 and the average family size was 3.11.

The age distribution was 31.0% under the age of 18, 9.3% from 18 to 24, 39.0% from 25 to 44, 14.7% from 45 to 64, and 6.0% 65 or older. The median age was 29 years. For every 100 females, there were 99.6 males. For every 100 females age 18 and over, there were 92.4 males.

The median household income was $50,118 and the median family income  was $57,240. Males had a median income of $37,436 versus $27,961 for females. The per capita income for the city was $20,265. About 3.9% of families and 4.4% of the population were below the poverty line, including 6.2% of those under age 18 and 8.8% of those age 65 or over.

Economy
The Owner–Operator Independent Drivers Association is based in Grain Valley.

Education
The Grain Valley R-V School District serves Grain Valley, as well as parts of Blue Springs, Oak Grove, and unincorporated eastern Jackson County, in the State of Missouri. The district had an enrollment of over 4000 students in 2015, up from 1659 students in 2000. Grain Valley R-V School District operates four elementary schools, two middle schools, and Grain Valley High School. Grain Valley has a public library, a branch of the Mid-Continent Public Library.

References

External links
 Official website

Cities in Jackson County, Missouri
Cities in Kansas City metropolitan area
Cities in Missouri